Bourton is a village and civil parish in the Vale of White Horse about  southeast of Highworth in neighbouring Wiltshire. The western boundary of the parish is a stream that also forms the county boundary.  Bourton was part of the parish of Shrivenham until 1867. Bourton was part of Berkshire until the 1974 local government boundary changes transferred the Vale of White Horse to Oxfordshire. The 2011 Census recorded the parish population as 326.

Manor
Bourton seems to have begun as part of the manor of Shrivenham. Its toponym evolved from Burghton in the 14th century via Borton in the 17th century and has appeared also as Burton. In 1476 George Talbot, 4th Earl of Shrewsbury was feudal overlord of the manor of Buckand in Over Bourton. The manor had been held by Sir William Lovel, Lord Morley, who died in that year. In 1529 the manor was recorded as being "late of Sir Francis Lovell", who was attainted in 1485 for supporting Richard III and died childless in 1487. The manor was still owned by the Crown in 1529 but was leased from 1542. From then until 1664 the Hinton family held the manor, but no subsequent record of it is known.

Economic history
At the centre of Bourton village are the remains of a 14th-century stone cross. The base stands on three square stone steps. The top of the cross has been lost but most of the shaft survives. Stone crosses marked a site for either open-air preaching or a regular public market. Historic England considers Bourton's cross to be for the latter. It is a scheduled monument.  Bourton's common lands were enclosed in 1792. After the First World War the Swindon – Faringdon main road was classified as the A420. Later in the 20th century the road through Acorn Bridge was widened and realigned to relieve the S-bend by which the road passes under the railway. The westbound carriageway was re-routed through the easterly arch that is no longer used by the canal, and the westerly arch remained in use by only the eastbound carriageway.

In 1804–05 the Wilts & Berks Canal was extended eastwards from Swindon to Longcot. The canal passed through the northern part of Bourton parish, and Bourton Wharf was built beside the main road between Swindon and Faringdon. The canal supplied coal mainly from the Somerset Coalfield and smaller amounts from the Forest of Dean Coalfield and Moira. Despite railway competition, Bourton Wharf's trade continued to increase until 1848, when 823 long tons of Somerset coal were landed there. Thereafter however the railway increasingly dominated coal and other freight traffic, and trade at Bourton Wharf declined rapidly. 

Bourton Wharf had a small revival in the 1860s but in 1876 the wharf received only 27 tons of Somerset coal, which equates to a full cargo for only one narrowboat in the entire year. Bourton Wharf handled small amounts of cargo in the mid-1890s, at least some of which was local traffic to or from Melksham and Wantage. By this time the Wilts & Berks' maintenance and dredging had deteriorated to the extent that narrowboats could not operate fully laden. In 1901 the Stanley Aqueduct over the River Marden in Wiltsire collapsed and the little remaining traffic virtually ceased. The Wilts & Berks Canal was formally abandoned in 1914.

The Great Western Main Line railway was built through the parish in 1840, passing just north of Lower Bourton. Acorn Bridge was built for the Great Western in the western part of Bourton parish close to the Wiltshire county boundary. It is a brick bridge, built askew, and is a "double bridge", i.e. it has two arches. The easterly one spanned the canal and the westerly one spanned the Swindon – Faringdon main road.

Social history
Bourton House was built in 1845. It is now the premises of Pinewood School, a co-educational preparatory school founded in 1875.  Cleycourt Manor, formerly known as Bourton Grange, is a Grade II Listed manor house dating back to 1847, built in Jacobean Dutch style, by the Tucker family.  The Tuckers endowed the Bourton village school which was built in 1842 It was later extended with the addition of a second classroom. It was still open after 1920 but has since closed. The Tuckers also established six almshouses in 1847 and contributed to the rebuilding of the parish church.

Churches
Bourton Baptist Church was built in 1851 for the owner of Bourton House. It is a Gothic revival building, emulating Decorated Gothic. It is now the village hall.  The Church of England parish church of St James was designed by J.W. Hugall and is another Gothic Revival building. Page and Ditchfield state that it was built in 1881, but Nikolaus Pevsner states that it was built in 1860.  St James' parish is now part of the Church of England Benefice of Shrivenham and Ashbury, which also includes Compton Beauchamp, Fernham, Longcot and Watchfield. Low attendance and a parish deficit of £6,000 per year led the Diocese of Oxford to serve notice at the end of 2003 to make St. James' redundant. Increased attendance and a £2,000 increase in parish income from January 2004 onwards led the Diocese to rescind the notice by June of that year.

Gallery

References

Sources

External links

Civil parishes in Oxfordshire
Villages in Oxfordshire